The 1935 Sun Bowl was the inaugural edition of the Sun Bowl, an American football postseason bowl game. Played on New Year's Day of 1935, the game featured high school teams and was sponsored by the El Paso Kiwanis club. The following year's game, the 1936 edition, was the first Sun Bowl matchup between college football teams. The game has been held annually in El Paso, Texas, from 1935 to the present.

Teams
The El Paso All-Stars started practice in mid-December with players from the Austin, Bowie, Cathedral, and El Paso High Schools. Selected as their opponent were the Bulldogs of Ranger High School in Ranger, Texas. Ranger entered the Sun Bowl with a 5–1 record, having defeated Breckenridge High School for their district championship when both teams were 4–0, then losing to Amarillo High School in a state playoff game.

The El Paso team was co-coached by Mack Saxon, head coach of the Texas Mines Miners (now the UTEP Miners), and Harry Phillips, who had been a running back for the Texas Longhorns in the late 1920s. The Ranger team was coached by Ottis "Red" Moore.

Game summary

Scoring summary

Source:

Statistics

Source:

References

Further reading

External links
 Aaron Anderson bio
 Rankin Britt bio
 Ken Heineman obit

Sun Bowl
January 1935 sports events
Sun Bowl